Yusi is a town in Lu County, Luzhou, Sichuan province, China. , it administers the following two residential neighborhoods and 11 villages:
Neighborhoods
Xingshun Community
Tongyuan Community

Villages
Chentuo Village
Yafengyan Village
Leida Village
Guqiao Village
Qixin Village
Leiba Village
Xinqiao Village
Zhouyan Village
Tanba Village
Xinglong Village
Zhaonan Village

See also 
 List of township-level divisions of Sichuan

References 

Township-level divisions of Sichuan
Lu County